Rufford Colliery was a coal mine located near Rainworth, a village in Nottinghamshire, England.  Its first shafts were sunk in 1911. In February 1913, fourteen workers at the mine died when a water barrel "containing some tons of water was precipitated down the shaft on to some men who were working at the bottom" of one of shafts. The mine was operated by Bolsover Colliery Company from 1915 to 1946, the National Coal Board from 1947 to 1987, and the British Coal Corporation from 1987 to 1993. The mine ceased operation in 1993.
In 2021, Nottinghamshire County Council commenced a project to plant trees on the site of the former colliery.

References

Coal mines in Nottinghamshire
Coal mining disasters in England
1911 establishments in England
1993 disestablishments in England